José Clímaco (born 1924–1985) was a Filipino film director.

As a budding composer and director, Climaco spent part of the studying filmmaking in Hollywood by 1939. Upon his return to Manila, he became the manager of a radio station. He met his wife, Lilian Velez, when she won first place in a singing contest sponsored by his station. They were married in 1942 and they had one child named Vivian (1944–2021).

Climaco joined Filippine Films & Philippine Pictures as a director after the World War II. He directed his wife in her film debut, and in several films afterwards which she had starred in with her leading man, the former child actor Narding Anzures. Perhaps the most famous film he made with Velez was Ang Kabukiran, a film inspired by a song composed by his father-in-law and popularized by his wife.

In 1948, Velez was murdered by her co-star Anzures, an event that shocked Manila. Climaco  has finally joined LVN Pictures as a director, shortly after her wife's tragic death and soon resumed his filmmaking career. He directed films for LVN until the late 1950s. Among his other films for LVN include Parola, starring Jaime de la Rosa and Norma Blancaflor. Climaco would also indulge in cameo appearances in his own films.

Filmography

1947 -Sa Kabukiran  - aka In the Field

1947 -G.I. Fever

1949 -Parola  [Lvn]  (dir) aka Lighthouse

1949 -Tambol Mayor  [Lvn]  (dir)

1949 -Ang Kandidato  [Lvn]  (dir) aka The Candidate

1949 -Biglang Yaman  [Lvn]  (dir) aka One Day Millionaire

1950 -Nagsaulian ng Kandila  [Lvn]  (dir)

1951 -Nasaan ka,  Giliw  [Lvn]  (dir) aka Love, Where are you?

1952 -Harana sa Karagatan  [Lvn]  (a) (dir) aka Ocean Serenade

1952 -Isabelita  [Lvn]  (dir)

1953 -Awit ng Pag-ibig  [Lvn]  (dir) aka Song of Love

1953 -Dalawang Pag-ibig  [Lvn]  (dir) aka Two Love

1955 -Palasyong Pawid  [Lvn]  (dir) aka Wood Palace

1955 -Karnabal  [Lvn]  (dir) aka Carnival

1956 -Everlasting  [Lvn]  (dir)

1957 -Nasaan ka Irog?  [Lvn]  (dir) aka Where are you Dear?

In popular culture
Climaco was portrayed by Joel Torre in crime biopic The Lilian Velez Story: Till Death Do Us Part (1995), starring Sharon Cuneta as Lilian Velez and Cesar Montano as Narding Anzures

References

External links

Filipino film directors
1924 births
1985 deaths